Brendan O'Riordan  was an Irish soccer player during the 1970s.

His first club was Shamrock Rovers and he signed for Bohemians in November 1978 where he made 1 appearance for Bohs in European competition. His signing from Milltown was controversial.

A Republic of Ireland national football team youth international  in his first season, he won the FAI League Cup at Dalymount Park.

Younger brother of Don O'Riordan.

Honours
FAI League Cup
 Bohemian F.C. 1979

References 

Republic of Ireland association footballers
Republic of Ireland youth international footballers
League of Ireland players
Bohemian F.C. players
Shamrock Rovers F.C. players
Living people
Association footballers not categorized by position
Year of birth missing (living people)